Ahmet Buğrahan Tuncer (born March 23, 1993) is a Turkish professional basketball player who plays as both point guard and shooting guard positions for Anadolu Efes of the Turkish Basketbol Süper Ligi (BSL) and the Euroleague. He averaged 8.2 points per game in 2019–20. Tuncer re-signed with Anadolu Efes on July 10, 2020.

References

External links
Buğrahan Tuncer Euroleague.net Profile
Buğrahan Tuncer TBLStat.net Profile
Buğrahan Tuncer Eurobasket Profile
Buğrahan Tuncer TBL Profile

1993 births
Living people
2019 FIBA Basketball World Cup players
Aliağa Petkim basketball players
Anadolu Efes S.K. players
Eskişehir Basket players
Mersin Büyükşehir Belediyesi S.K. players
Point guards
Shooting guards
Turkish men's basketball players
Yeşilgiresun Belediye players